Mazhi Tuzhi Reshimgath is an Indian Marathi language drama television series airing on Zee Marathi. It premiered on 23 August 2021 by replacing Aggabai Sunbai. It is directed by Ajay Mayekar and written by Sankarshan Karhade under the banner of Creative Minds Production. It starred Prarthana Behere and Shreyas Talpade in lead roles.

Plot 
Yashwardhan Chaudhari, also known as Yash, is a wealthy businessman in Dubai while Neha Kamat is an employee in his company. Neha's ex-husband Avinash Nayak had abandoned her when she was pregnant and she had thus raised her 4-year-old daughter Pari Kamat all by herself. She and Pari live in a small chawl next to their neighbours Bandu Kaka and Aruna Kaku who are like parents to Neha and grandparents to Pari. Neha's estranged brother does not meet her but she is often visited by her sister-in-law Meenakshi Kamat. Neha works in Yash's company with her close friend Shefali. Meanwhile, Yash returns to India to live with his elderly grandfather Jagannath Chaudhari, also known as Aajoba, who had raised him all by himself after his parents' death in a car accident. Yash's other family members are his unintelligent uncle Satyajit Chaudhari, alcoholic uncle Vishwajit Chaudhari, cunning aunt Seema Chaudhari, childless aunt Mithila Chaudhari and cousin brother Pushkaraj Chaudhari. 

Soon, Yash learns about a fraud committed in their company by Seema and decides to get hold of the fraudster. He thus pretends to be a poor employee in the Choudhary industries while his close friend Sameer disguises himself as the employer and Shefali falls in love with him. During this charade, Yash meets Neha on his birthday when he comes to the Choudhary house to deliver a file. He drops her off in Mumbai from his helicopter as it is Pari's birthday as well on that day. Without revealing his identity, Yash befriends Neha and Pari who quickly accept him as their friend, thinking he is some ordinary guy. Yash even comes to their house to help them during Neha's illness. Sameer instantly believes that they are in love which is denied by Yash, saying that they are just good friends. Yash even thinks of telling Neha about himself but cannot do so due to the fraud. 

Few months later, Yash gains Sameer's advice of revealing his identity to Neha due to the launch of his new product. Before he can meet Neha, the advertising campaign rolls out and she is shell-shocked to learn about his identity. Believing him to be a fraud, she confronts him over cheating on her and forbids him from meeting Pari anymore. At this point, Yash confesses his love for Neha but she denies it and severed ties with him, claiming him to be an unknown person. Including Pari, no one supports Neha and forgive Yash while Sameer tries to give Yash ideas to reconcile with Neha. Meanwhile, Seema cooks up a plan to ruin Yash's image but in vain. 

Gaining Sameer's advice, Yash goes to Neha's house to speak to her where her neighbours discuss about their marriage. Irked by their words, a furious Neha chastises Yash in front of everyone and orders him to leave, begging him not to interfere in her life. Pari and Bandu Kaku are upset with Neha for behaving rudely with Yash. Hurt and angry due to Neha's words, Yash uncontrollably drives his car at a high speed and ends up meeting with a major road accident. On learning about this, Neha realises Yash's innocence and feels guilty over her actions. She rushes to the hospital barefoot to meet Yash and tries to reconcile with him. 

However, Yash releases Neha from the company's bond soon after his recovery. Neha initially agrees to leave the company but ultimately expresses her wish of withdrawing her resignation. Yash accepts her back as his employee and Neha confesses her love for him too. Finally, all ends well and both Pari and Aajoba agree for Yash and Neha's marriage. Yash and Neha successfully get married. 

However, Avinash "returns" and secretly joins as Pari's driver in order to obtain money from the Choudhary property. Pari is instantly attached to him and begins to like his company. On Neha's birthday, she ends up seeing Avinash in the servant quarters and is deeply shocked to learn that he is Pari's driver. However, Avinash lies to Yash that he has major cancer and would not remain for long. This results in Neha not telling Yash the truth about Avinash. Meenakshi, Bandu Kaka and Kaku also learn about Avinash but decide to keep this a secret for the sake of Yash. 

On Neha's request, Yash fires Avinash from his job which causes an adamant Pari to develop fever and crave for his return. At this point, Seema discovers the truth of Avinash and Pari's relationship after tracing Avinash to his house and begins to help him in his plan. She deliberately publishes the news about him in the newspaper and Avinash returns to the Choudhary house, delighting Pari. Eventually, Yash comes across Pari's birth certificate and is shocked to read Avinash's name as her biological father on it. He is hurt as Neha did not tell him the truth herself and tries to make her confess the same multiple times but in vain. He even reveals Avinash's truth to Sameer who reassures him about Neha and informs the same to Shefali. 

On Yash and Pari's birthday, Seema exposes Avinash's truth in front of everyone and tries to instigate Yash against Neha. Avinash then fools everyone by saying that it was Neha who blackmailed him and made him perform all the wrongdoings. Yash and Aajoba believe him and refuse to accept Neha, leaving her helpless. Eventually, Neha leaves the Choudhary house with Pari and returns to her house in the chawl. Bandu Kaka decides to confront Yash over injustice to Neha who stops him, saying that she will have to defend herself alone.

The next day, Vishwajit reveals to Yash that he was driving the car during the time of his parents' accident. Aajoba thus started blaming Vishwajit for the death of Yash's parents and that is why he began to drink. Stunned to hear this, Yash stops talking to both Vishwajit and Aajoba for keeping this fact a secret from him for several years. However, Mithila harshly confronts Aajoba over his behaviour with Vishwajit from the last 25 years. Aajoba eventually realises how hurtful if must have had for Vishwajit when he never behaved with him kindly since Yash's parents' demise. He genuinely apologises to Vishwajit and the two reunite.

Meanwhile, Pari is stunned to end up learning that Avinash is her biological father due to his ploy. She stops talking to both Neha and Yash for hiding this major truth from her. This causes a hurt Yash to come to the Choudhary house in a drunken state, delighting Seema. Aajoba is devastated to see Yash drunk and Seema tells him that Neha is responsible for this situation, angering him.

Meanwhile, Avinash meets Neha and having created the custody papers of Pari, gives her two choices regarding Pari's custody; either they both will marry and live with Pari as her parents, or he will seek Pari's custody and live with her as a single parent, not letting Neha meet her daughter. This worries Neha about Pari and she approaches Yash for help. On seeing the papers, Yash states that either the papers are fake or Avinash's disease. Hearing Yash's statement, Neha decides to investigate about Avinash's illness, and challenges Yash that if he truly loves her, he should visit her house the next day. Later that day, Shefali recounts the friendship of Yash and Neha at the office which leaves Yash teary-eyed.

Avinash tells Neha that he has successfully recovered from his illness and that he will prove it to her the next day. Seema plans to obtain the Choudhary property from Yash who currently owns it. She threatens Satyajit when he tries to reveal this to Aajoba. According to her plan, Seema lies to Yash who unknowingly hands over all the property to her by signing on the documents without reading them.  

The next day, Avinash brings a pathologist before Neha who confesses about his recovery from cancer. However, when Yash arrives at the scene, Avinash begins to kick the pathologist out and lies to Yash that it was Neha who brought him to prove about his illness. Elsewhere, Satyajit burns Seema's property documents in order to stop her from doing any conspiracy. This leaves Seema deeply shocked and in a fit of rage, she slaps Satyajit and decides to hand him over to the police.  

Suspicious about Avinash after his escape, Yash calls Sameer and scares the pathologist, who eventually confesses the truth that Avinash has no cancer and that he made him create fake reports about his illness. Realising Neha's innocence, Aajoba and Vishwajit apologise to Neha for doubting her and making her leave the house.  Meanwhile, Yash chases Avinash to an under-construction building and beats him up severely, before bringing him back to Neha's house and deliberately having him attempt to "kill" Pari.

Pari is rescued but learns Avinash's true face due to this actions, before the police are called in and Avinash is arrested for his crimes. Satyajit then brings Seema to Neha's house and makes her confess her conspiracies to Yash and Neha. In the flashback, it is shown that Seema tried to call the police to have Satyajit, Yash, Vishwajit and Aajoba arrested for making her suffer domestic violence. However, Satyajit stopped her and forced her to reform if she wishes to live in the palace peacefully. Having realised her mistakes, Seema apologises to Yash who refuses to forgive her and Satyajit tries to have the police arrest her too. Neha forgives Seema and asks Yash and Satyajit to offer her a second chance in life for the sake of Pushkaraj's future. In the end, Yash apologises to Neha and the two happily reconcile.

Cast

Main 
 Shreyas Talpade as Yashwardhan Chaudhari (Yash)
 Prarthana Behere as Neha Prakash Kamat / Neha Avinash Nayak / Neha Yashwardhan Chaudhari / Anushka Jayantibhai Mehta
 Myra Vaikul as Pari Avinash Nayak / Pari Yashwardhan Chaudhari

Recurring 
Yash's family
 Mohan Joshi / Pradeep Welankar as Jagannath Chaudhari (Jaggu)
 Atul Mahajan as Satyajeet Jagannath Chaudhari
 Sheetal Kshirsagar as Seema Satyajeet Chaudhari (Simmi)
 Ved Ambre as Pushkaraj Satyajeet Chaudhari (Pikuchu)
 Anand Kale as Vishwajeet Jagannath Chaudhari
 Swati Pansare as Mithila Vishwajeet Chaudhari

Neha's family
 Nikhil Rajeshirke as Avinash Nayak
 Swati Deval as Meenakshi Ajay Kamat
 Manasi Magikar as Aruna Bandopant Naik
 Ajit Kelkar as Bandopant Naik (Bandu Kaka)

Others
 Sankarshan Karhade as Sameer
 Kajal Kate as Shefali
 Gauri Kendre as Mohini
 Chaitanya Chandratre as Rajan Hemant Paranjape
 Sanika Banaraswale-Joshi as Charulata
 Jane Kataria as Jessica
 Dinesh Kanade as Mr. Ghartonde
 Varsha Ghatpande as Anuradha Karnik
 Charuta Supekar as Preeti
 Krishna Mahadik as Ojas
 Pranali Ovhal as Guddi
 Nupur Daithankar as Revati Desai
 Madhav Abhyankar as Jayantibhai Mehta
 Vinayak Bhave as Ritesh Mehta
 Geetanjali Ganage as Kinjal Ritesh Mehta
 Yogini Pophale as Sujata

Reception

Special episode

1 hour 
 31 October 2021
 6 February 2022
 20 March 2022
 24 July 2022
 14 August 2022
 13 November 2022
 15 January 2023
 22 January 2023

2 hours 
 12 June 2022 (Yash and Neha's marriage)

Seasons 
 22 October 2022 (1 year later)

Airing history

Adaptations

Awards

References

External links 
 
 Mazhi Tuzhi Reshimgath at ZEE5

Marathi-language television shows
Zee Marathi original programming
2021 Indian television series debuts
2023 Indian television series endings